Licking Valley may refer to:
 Licking Valley High School, a public high school in Hanover, Ohio
 Licking Valley Campus, a campus of Maysville Community and Technical College in Cynthiana, Kentucky
 Licking Valley, the watershed of the Licking River in Kentucky
 Licking Valley, the watershed of the Licking River in Ohio